Macrocilix nongloba is a moth in the family Drepanidae. It was described by Hong-Fu Chu and Lin-Yao Wang in 1988. It is found in the Chinese provinces of Sichuan, Jiangxi and Zhejiang.

The length of the forewings is 13–18 mm. Adults are externally similar to Macrocilix orbifera.

References

Moths described in 1988
Drepaninae